Edmund's spurdog (Squalus edmundsi) is a dogfish described in 2007. It is a member of the family Squalidae, found off western Australia and Indonesia.

References

Edmund's spurdog
Fish of Indonesia
Marine fish of Western Australia
Taxa named by William Toby White
Taxa named by Peter R. Last
Taxa named by John D. Stevens
Edmund's spurdog